Yober Ortega (born August 21, 1965) is a retired boxer from Venezuela who was a former 
WBA super bantamweight champion.

External links

1965 births
Living people
Super-bantamweight boxers
Featherweight boxers
World Boxing Association champions
Venezuelan male boxers